"Ride Like the Wind" is the debut single by American singer-songwriter Christopher Cross. It was released in February 1980 as the lead single from his Grammy-winning 1979 self-titled debut album. It reached number two on the US charts for four consecutive weeks, behind "Call Me" by Blondie. On the album's inner sleeve, Christopher Cross dedicated this song to Lowell George, formerly of the band Little Feat, who had died in 1979. It features backing vocals by Michael McDonald and a guitar solo by Cross.

History

Lyrics
The lyrics of the song tell the story of a condemned criminal on the run to Mexico. Told from a first-person point of view, it describes how an outlaw and convicted multiple murderer, on the run from a death-by-hanging sentence, has to "ride like the wind" to reach "the border of Mexico," where, presumably, the posse in pursuit of him will not be able to reach him.

Cross described "Ride Like The Wind" as "sort of a romanticized Western where the bad guy gets away." The setting can be surmised to have been from the time before the United States and Mexico signed their mutual criminal-extradition treaty.

Origin
Cross was high on LSD when he wrote the lyrics. "We were living in Houston at the time, and on the way down to Austin to record the songs, it was just a beautiful Texas day. I took acid. So I wrote the words on the way down from Houston to Austin."

Tribute
In 1999, the satirical newspaper The Onion published a story with the headline, "Christopher Cross Finally Reaches Mexican Border"; the headline was a reference to the song, and the three-sentence story made several specific allusions to the lyrics. Cross appreciated the honor.

Charts

Weekly charts

Year-end charts

East Side Beat version

In 1991, Italian dance music group East Side Beat remixed "Ride Like the Wind" in a style typical of early 1990s dance music. There are five remixes in total. Two versions are found on the 7-inch single and an additional three are on the CD single. The Factory edit was included on FFRR Records' Only for the Headstrong compilation album released in 1992.

Formats and track listings
 7-inch single
 "Ride Like the Wind" (Factory edit) – 3:58	
 "Ride Like the Wind" (Subway mix) – 4:09

 CD single
 "Ride Like the Wind" (Factory edit) – 3:58	
 "Ride Like the Wind" (Factory mix) – 5:51	
 "Ride Like the Wind" (piano version) – 5:32	
 "Ride Like the Wind" (Oceanic remix) – 5:22	
 "Ride Like the Wind" (Subway mix) – 4:00

Charts

Weekly charts

Year-end charts

Laurent Wery version

Belgian DJ Laurent Wéry released a cover version of the song, which features vocals from Joss Mendosah. The song was produced by Laurent Wery. It was released in Belgium as a digital download on March 30, 2013. The song peaked at number 26 in Belgium.

Music video
A music video to accompany the release of "Ride Like the Wind" was first released on YouTube on April 8, 2013, at a total length of two minutes and fifty-four seconds.

Track listing

Charts

Release history

Saxon version

English heavy metal band Saxon released a cover of "Ride Like the Wind" as the first track on their 1988 album Destiny.

Music video
A music video to accompany the release of "Ride Like the Wind" was first released on YouTube on August 7, 2013.

References

1979 songs
1980 debut singles
1991 singles
2013 singles
Christopher Cross songs
Music videos directed by Bruce Gowers
Songs written by Christopher Cross
Song recordings produced by Michael Omartian
Warner Records singles
FFRR Records singles